The Lyons State Forest is a state forest located near the city of Staples in Wadena County, Minnesota. The forest is managed by the Minnesota Department of Natural Resources.

History and overview
The forest and surrounding area of the Crow Wing River valley were originally inhabited by the Eastern Dakota and Ojibwe people. European exploration began as a result of the fur trade by the French in the early 18th century, and subsequently the Canadian and British in the 1760s. The old-growth forests were logged extensively between 1870 and the early 20th century; the lumber industry in the area declined rapidly after the depletion of the mature forests. Wildfires historically occurred every 10 to 40 years, which explains the dominance of Jack Pine, Aspen, and Paper Birch in the forest, although stands of Eastern White and Red Pine also occur. The topographical features of the forest, such as terminal moraines, outwash plains, till plains, and drumlin fields, as well as the sandy loam soil texture, were caused by the Wisconsinan glaciation.

Recreation
Popular outdoor recreational activities are hunting and dispersed camping. Trails are designated for hiking, with  designated for Class I all-terrain vehicle and off-road motorcycling use.

See also
List of Minnesota state forests

External links
Lyons State Forest - Minnesota Department of Natural Resources (DNR)

References

Minnesota state forests
Protected areas of Wadena County, Minnesota
Protected areas established in 1963